Bullockus varai is a species of sea snail, a marine gastropod mollusk in the family Fasciolariidae, the spindle snails, the tulip snails and their allies.

Description

Distribution

References

External links
 Lyons W.G. & Snyder M.A. (2008). New genera and species of Peristerniinae (Gastropoda: Fasciolariidae) from the Caribbean region, with comments on the fasciolariid fauna of Bermuda. The Veliger. 50(3): 225-240

Fasciolariidae
Gastropods described in 1970